Patrick Lindsay may refer to:

 Patrick Lindsay, 4th Lord Lindsay (died 1526), counsellor of James IV of Scotland
 Patrick Lindsay, 6th Lord Lindsay (1521–1589), opponent of Mary, Queen of Scots
 Patrick Lindsay (bishop) (1566–1644), Archbishop of Glasgow
 Patrick Lindsay (Irish politician) (1914–1993), Irish Fine Gael politician
 Patrick Lindsay (Edinburgh MP) (1686–1753), British Army officer and Scottish politician

See also
Pat Lindsey (1936–2009), politician
Pat Lindsey (golfer) (born 1952), American professional golfer